Otello Buscherini (19 January 1949 in Forlì - 16 May 1976 in Mugello) was an Italian Grand Prix motorcycle road racer. His best years were in 1973 when he won two Grand Prix races and in 1974 when he finished the season in fourth place in the 125cc world championship. Buscherini was killed during the 1976 Nations Grand Prix at Mugello. He won three Grand Prix races during his career.

References 

1949 births
1976 deaths
People from Forlì
Italian motorcycle racers
50cc World Championship riders
125cc World Championship riders
250cc World Championship riders
350cc World Championship riders
Motorcycle racers who died while racing
Sport deaths in Italy
Sportspeople from the Province of Forlì-Cesena